Nikolay Vasilyevich Safronov (born 8 May 1940) is a retired Russian rower who had his best achievements in the coxed pairs, together with Leonid Rakovshchik and Igor Rudakov. In this event they won two European medals in 1964 and 1965 and finished fourth at the 1964 Summer Olympics.

References

1940 births
Living people
Olympic rowers of the Soviet Union
Rowers at the 1964 Summer Olympics
Soviet male rowers
Russian male rowers
European Rowing Championships medalists